Fire services in Durham Region, Ontario, Canada, are provided by each municipality. There are 27 fire stations across the region.

Operations

Ajax Fire and Emergency Services consists of 100 full-time staff operating from three fire halls. The department has six pumpers, two aerials, a pumper/tanker and rescue truck. The stations are as follows:

 Hall 41 - 40 Westney Road North
 Hall 42 - 435 Monarch Avenue
 Hall 43 - HQ - 900 Salem Road North

Brock Township Fire Department is mainly a part-time operation, with 68 part-time staff and a full-time chief, full-time fire prevention officer operating from three fire halls. Vehicles operated include four pumpers, three rescue vehicles and three tankers. The department operates from the following stations:

 Station 8-1- Sunderland
 Station 8-2 - Cannington
 Station 8-3 - Beaverton

Clarington Fire Services consists of 50 full-time staff and approximately 120 part-time staff operating from five fire halls. Equipment consists of seven pumpers, one aerial, one rescue, one brush truck and five tankers. The department operates from the following stations:

 Hall #11 - 2240 Highway 2, Bowmanville (HQ) (Staffed by full-time firefighters)
 Hall #12 - 247 King St. East, Newcastle (Staffed by full time & part-time firefighters)
 Hall #13 - 5708 Main St., Orono Staffed by part-time firefighters)
 Hall #14 - 2611 Trulls Rd., Courtice (Staffed by full-time firefighters)
 Hall #15 - 2354 Concession 8, Enniskillen Staffed by part-time firefighters)

Oshawa Fire Services consists of over 190 full-time staff operating from six fire stations. The service operates seven pumpers, two aerials, one rescue and one tanker. There are six fire stations:

 Hall #21 - 199 Adelaide Avenue West (HQ)
 Hall #22 - 1111 Simcoe Street South
 Hall #23 - 50 Beatrice Street East
 Hall #24 - 50 Harmony Road North
 Hall #25 - 1550 Harmony Road North
 Hall #26 - Simcoe St. North and Brittanna
Oshawa Fire Services responds to calls at Oshawa Executive Airport.

Pickering Fire Services consists of 101 full-time staff operating from 4 fire halls. The service has five pumper/rescues, an aerial device, three tankers, one heavy rescue, a brush truck, and one support/rehab unit. All stations are full-time halls and are as follows:

 Hall # 52 - 553 Kingston Road
 Hall # 54 - 4941 Old Brock Road, Claremont
 Hall # 55 - 1616 Bayly Street - (HQ) opened 1970
 Hall # 56 - 1115 Finch Avenue

Hall # 1 was located at Kingston Road at Rosebank Road in a quonset hut. Old Station 2 on Pickering Beach Road is now in Ajax, Ontario. The old Brougham Fire Hall later became Station 3 and is now an abandoned antiques store on Highway 7 between Old Brock Road and Brougham Road.

Scugog Township Fire Department is mainly a part-time operation, but there are a number of full-time staff. The department operates five pumpers and two rescue units from two fire halls. These stations are:

 Hall #61 - 30 Crandel St., Port Perry
 Hall #62 - 3550 Durham Road 57, Caesarea

Uxbridge Fire Department consists of two full-time staff and 40 part-time staff operating from one fire hall. Equipment consists of three pumpers, one tanker and a rescue. The single station is located at 301 Brock Street West. Station 71

Whitby Fire and Emergency Services consists of over 140 full-time staff operating from 5 fire halls. The department has eight pumpers, two elevated platforms, a tanker and rescue truck. The stations are as follows:

 Station # 31 - 6745 Baldwin St., Brooklin
 Station # 32 - 1600 Manning Rd.
 Station # 33 - 1501 Brock St. South
 Station # 34 (formerly #6) - 734 Dundas St. West
 Station # 35 - 111 McKinney Dr. (HQ)
 proposed new fire halls**
 Station #36 - West Whitby Development (Rossland/Cornation Road)
 Station #37 & Training Grounds - Cochrane Street/Highway #7 Area Brooklin West

See also

 Durham Regional Police Service
 Durham Region EMS
 Vancouver Fire and Rescue Services
PARA-Marine Search and Rescue

External links
 Ajax Fire
 Clarington Emergency and Fire Services
 Oshawa Fire
 Pickering Fire Services
 Uxbridge Fire Department
 Whitby Fire Services

Regional Municipality of Durham
Fire departments in Ontario